Estherville Township is one of twelve townships in Emmet County, Iowa, USA.  As of the 2000 census, its population was 7,077.

History
Estherville Township takes its name from the county seat of Estherville. It was created prior to 1876, but the exact date is unknown because the records were destroyed in a courthouse fire.

Geography
According to the United States Census Bureau, Estherville Township covers an area of 36.15 square miles (93.63 square kilometers); of this, 35.81 square miles (92.75 square kilometers, 99.06 percent) is land and 0.34 square miles (0.88 square kilometers, 0.94 percent) is water.

Cities, towns, villages
 Estherville

Adjacent townships
 Emmet Township (north)
 Ellsworth Township (northeast)
 Center Township (east)
 High Lake Township (southeast)
 Twelve Mile Lake Township (south)
 Lloyd Township, Dickinson County (southwest)
 Richland Township, Dickinson County (west)
 Superior Township, Dickinson County (northwest)

Cemeteries
The township contains these five cemeteries: East Side, Estherville Lutheran, Norwegian, Oak Hill and Saint Patricks.

Major highways
  Iowa Highway 4
  Iowa Highway 9

Lakes
 Cheever Lake
 Fourmile Lake

Landmarks
 Fort Defiance State Park
 Iowa Lakes Community College

School districts
 Estherville Lincoln Central Com School District

Political districts
 Iowa's 4th congressional district
 State House District 7
 State Senate District 4

References
 United States Census Bureau 2008 TIGER/Line Shapefiles
 United States Board on Geographic Names (GNIS)
 United States National Atlas

External links
 US-Counties.com
 City-Data.com

Townships in Emmet County, Iowa
Townships in Iowa